Scouting in New York has a long history, from the 1910s to the present day, serving thousands of youth in programs that suit the environment in which they live. The first National Boy Scouts of America (BSA) Headquarters was in New York City, and the Girl Scouts of the USA National Headquarters is currently located at 420 5th Avenue, New York, New York.

Early history (1910-1950)
On September 10, 1910, S. F. Lester of Troy, New York, became the very first person to hold the Scouting leadership position of Scoutmaster (approved by the BSA). He received his certification from the BSA headquarters in New York City. In 1910 he led a group of 30 scouts at Camp Ilium, in Pownal, Vermont. Camp Ilium was the starting point of the Boy Scout Movement for Troy, and Pownal.

Following the lead of the State of Michigan, the State of New York formed its own Forest Scouts. This group was formed in response to a number of late 19th century and early 20th century forest fires and were effectively "auxiliary fire wardens".

The 1924 National Order of the Arrow Lodge Meeting was held at Kanohwanke Scout Camp near Tuxedo, New York and the 1929 National Lodge Meeting was held at Philadelphia, Pennsylvania.

Recent history (1950-present)
In the 1970s and again in the 1990s, upstate New York went through a huge consolidation of small, historic councils.

In recent years, New York has also been home to smaller, independent scouting organizations.

Scouting today

Boy Scouts

There are seventeen Boy Scouts of America (BSA) local councils in New York.

Allegheny Highlands Council

The Allegheny Highlands Council serves Scouts in Chautauqua, Cattaraugus, and Allegany counties in New York and McKean and Potter counties in Pennsylvania. Its Service Center is located in Falconer, New York, and is visible on Hough Hill from Route 86.

Organization
The council is divided into two districts:
 Western Gate District
 Two Lakes District

Camps
It has two camps: Camp Merz and Elk Lick Scout Reserve.
Elk Lick is tucked into the heart of the Allegheny Mountains in Smethport, Pennsylvania, and operates exclusively as a Cub Scout summer camp.
Camp Merz is located on Lake Chautauqua, just up the road from the Chautauqua Institution in western New York, and is a Scouts BSA summer camp. Camp Merz has a waterfront and many waterfront-related merit badges available for scouts. Both camps are opens to all scouts for year-round camping.

Order of the Arrow
 Ho-Nan-Ne-Ho-Ont Lodge 165

Baden-Powell Council

Baden-Powell Council was formed in 1998 by the merger of the former Baden-Powell Council (headquartered in Dryden, New York) and Susquenango Council (headquartered in Binghamton, New York). The council's new headquarters are in Binghamton.  The council covers five counties in New York State—Broome, Chenango, Cortland, Tioga and Tompkins—as well as Susquehanna County in Pennsylvania.

Organization
As of 2017, the Council has four districts:
 Chenango District (Chenango County and part of Broome County)
 Delahanna District (Susquehanna County in Pennsylvania)
 Hiawatha District (Tioga County and part of Broome County)
 Taughannock District (Cortland and Tompkins Counties)

Camps
The Baden-Powell Council operates two Scout Camps:

It is approximately nine miles north of Ithaca.

Camp Barton has nine summer camping sites with 2- and 4-man platform tents, as well as a winter lean-to site in one of the two gorges which surround the camp. The camp facilities include many water-based activities on the camp's quarter-mile of waterfront, including rowing, motorboating, sailing, waterskiing, jetskiing and swimming,  as well as handicraft, nature, rifle and archery ranges, and scoutcraft areas.

The Camp's buildings and cabins are available for off-season use by Scouting and other youth organizations.

Tuscarora Scout Reservation is a Boy Scouts of America camp located on 1200 acres (4.5 km2) around Summit Lake in New York State's Southern Tier.

The camp has ten summer camping sites with 2-man platform tents. It has five winter units with a center lodge equipped with wood stoves, refrigerators and electricity and four 8-man lean-tos. They also offer mountainboarding, paddleboard, shotgun and rifle range as well as multiple Wilderness Programs and Scoutcraft programs. The camp is available year-round for camping, hiking as well as shotgun and rifle programs. Tuscarora Scout Reservation hosts over 500 Scouts and leaders each January and February for its Winter Camp programs. Tuscarora hosts the Council's annual National Youth Leadership Training Course every August.

Order of the Arrow
The corresponding Order of the Arrow lodge is Otahnagon Lodge 172, a nationally recognized lodge.

Connecticut Rivers Council

The Connecticut Rivers Council serves the majority of the State of Connecticut in addition to Fisher's Island in New York.

Five Rivers Council

Five Rivers Council serves Scouts in the Southern tier of New York and the Northern tier of Pennsylvania.

Organization
The council is divided into three districts:
 Endless Mountains District
 Big Horn District
 Silver Fawn District

Camps
It operates two camps: Camp Brulé, in North East Pennsylvania, and Camp Gorton on Waneta Lake in New York.

Camp Gorton

Camp Gorton, located on Waneta Lake in the middle of the Finger Lakes, provides over 350 acres of land in Upstate New York for Scouts BSA camps. In 2014 Camp Gorton celebrated its 92nd year of existence and 90th anniversary of being a scout camp on the east side of Waneta Lake.

Camp Gorton provides a program that is well-suited for younger scouts and is known for having an excellent waterfront and shooting sports programs. At the waterfront they offer facilities for fulfilling the Water Sports merit badge requirements as well as those for the Motorboating merit badge for no additional fee. Their Shooting Sports ranges have 16 slots for fulfilling the Rifle merit badge requirements and has plenty of cover for Scouts, Leaders, and Parents to come and observe.

Camp Brulé

Camp Brulé (pronounced "Brul-a"), named after Étienne Brûlé, is in Sullivan County, Pennsylvania. It was founded by the General Sullivan Council with headquarters in Athens and jurisdiction over Bradford, Tioga and Sullivan Counties.

Pancost Hall and Crandall Hall are memorials to Alfred H. Pancost, Chief Scout Executive and founder, and to Harry H. Crandall, first president of the council.

On the parade ground a native boulder bears a bronze plaque in memory of Eagle Scout twin brothers from Troop 2, Towanda, Pennsylvania, Army Air Corp Lieutenants John R. and William G. Winter. Born August 11, 1925, they were killed in action in World War II on August 11, 1945. The plaque was erected by employees of the Patterson Screen Company.

Order of the Arrow 
TKäen DōD Lodge 30 formed from three former lodges. Seneca Lodge 394, Wakanda Lodge 186, and Winingus Lodge 30. TKäen DōD celebrated its 25th anniversary in 2017

Greater Hudson Valley Council 
Greater Hudson Valley Council was formed in 2021 when the Hudson Valley Council merged with the Westchester-Putnam Council. This council serves scouts in southeastern New York.

Greater New York Councils 

The Greater New York Councils serves the Scouting families of the five boroughs of New York City.

Greater Niagara Frontier Council

Greater Niagara Frontier Council serves the territory of Erie and western Niagara Counties, with its headquarters in Buffalo.

History
In 1917, the Hamburg Council was formed, closing in 1920.

In 1912 the Buffalo Council (#373) and in 1921 the Erie County Council (#363) were formed. They merged in 1949 to form the Buffalo Area Council (#380). In 1917 the Niagara Falls Council (#387) was formed, chnaging its name to the Niagara Falls Area Council (#387) in 1925. In 1944, the council changed its name to the Niagara Frontier Council  (#387).

In 1967 the Buffalo Area Council (#380) and the Niagara Frontier Council (#387) merged to become the Greater Niagara Frontier Council (#380).

Organization
The council is organized into four districts:
 Tatonka District
 Red Jacket District
 Onondaga District
 Polaris District, serving Northern Erie and Western Niagara Counties.

Camps
Camp Scouthaven is one of the 5 oldest Scout camps in the United States still in operation (1918 - over 100 years). It is the home of GNFC Camps Summer Programs for Cub Scouting and Scouts BSA. Situated on beautiful Crystal Lake in Freedom, NY it boasts one of the best Aquatics programs around. Scouthaven is open to year-round program as well.

Schoellkopf Scout Reservation was formed in 1938 and is located in Cowlesville, NY. It was built through donations by the Schoellkopf family. Schoellkopf features over 650 acres of prime Scouting property. It has rustic log cabins, beautiful campsites, and newer spacious lean-to's all for year-round use.

Camp Stonehaven operates in Sanborn, NY and has accommodations including campsites, lean-to's and newer cabins. It is an ideal camp for out of town units that would like to tour Niagara Falls.

Longhouse Council

Longhouse Council was formed in 2010 as a merger of Hiawatha Seaway Council and Cayuga County Council. The Hiawatha Seaway Council was formed in 1999 as a result of the merger of the Hiawatha Council and Seaway Valley Council. The council is headquartered in Syracuse, NY. The council currently owns 2 camps, including Sabattis Scouting Reservation and Camp Woodland. The council covers six counties — Cayuga, Jefferson, Lewis, Oswego, Onondaga, and St. Lawrence.

Organization
The council is divided into seven districts:
 Cayuga County District (the former Cayuga County Council area)
 Interlakes District (Western Onondaga County)
 Northern Lights District (St. Lawrence County)
 Oneida District (Northern Onondaga County)
 Onondaga District (Southern Onondaga County)
 Ontario District (Oswego County)
 Tri-Rivers District (Jefferson and Lewis Counties)
As of June 2020, the Onondaga and Oneida Districts merged to become the Crossroads District

, Longhouse Council acquired a seventh district: Cayuga County. This was previously Cayuga County Council, which lost its charter.

Order of the Arrow
Lowanne Nimat Lodge 219, formed January 1, 2010 from Kayanernh Kowa and Tahgajute lodges.

The World Brotherhood Camporee is a weekend-long camping trip that Scouts from Canada and the U.S. participate in. The camporee is an annual event and takes place either in the Longhouse Council, New York or in the Loyalist Area of the Voyageur Council, Ontario, Canada.

The main events include Council Strip trading and a dance party.

Hudson Valley Council

The Hudson Valley Council was headquartered in Newburgh, New York, and also served Scouts in Pennsylvania. The grave of Daniel Carter Beard lies within the Hudson Valley Council, where an annual service is held. In 2021, it merged with the Westchester-Putnam Council to become the Greater Hudson Valley Council.

Organization
Its districts were: Rockland, Heritage, Delaware River, and Dutchess.

Camps
The Hudson Valley Council operated two year-round use properties - Camp Bullowa in Stony Point, NY and Camp Nooteeming in Salt Point, NY.

Order of the Arrow Lodge
 Nacha Nimat 86

Iroquois Trail Council

Iroquois Trail Council, with its headquarters in Oakfield, New York, serves Scouts in western New York. It was created in 1994 from a merger of two councils: Genesee (Genesee, Livingston, and Wyoming Counties) and Lewiston Trail (eastern Niagara and Orleans Counties).

Troop 1 was first formed in 1912, first chartered in 1914. When it was disbanded in late 1994 troop 1 had 80+ years continuous charter with the BSA.

Organization
As of 2007, the council is divided into three districts:
 Nundawaga District (Livingston and Wyoming Counties)
 Seneca District (eastern Orleans and Genesee Counties)
 Towpath District (western Orleans and eastern Niagara Counties)

When the two councils merged, it originally had four districts.
 Niagara District (Niagara County)
 Orleans District (Orleans County)
 Genishaua District (Genesee and northern Wyoming County)
 Letchworth District (northern Livingston and southern Wyoming County)

Camps
It has two camps: Camp Dittmer (Scouts BSA) and Camp Sam Wood (Cub Scout). Sam Wood was the first Eagle Scout in Genesee County. Sam Wood was a member of Troop 1 St. James Church, Batavia.

Order of the Arrow
Ashokwahta Lodge No. 339

Leatherstocking Council

Leatherstocking Council serves a portion of central New York. The council provides Scouting to Herkimer, Oneida and Madison Counties as well as part of Hamilton, Otsego, Delaware and Lewis Counties.

Rip Van Winkle Council

Rip Van Winkle Council serves the youth of Ulster and Greene counties of New York, and headquartered in Kingston. The Rip Van Winkle Council has the distinction of having 6 of the first 21 Eagle Scouts from the Class of 1912, the first class of Eagle Scouts.

Organization
The council is divided into two districts:
 Algonquin District (Ulster County)
 Mohican District (Greene County and Saugerties)

Camps
The council's camp, located in East Jewett, New York, is Camp Tri-Mount.

Order of the Arrow
 Half Moon Lodge

Seneca Waterways Council

Seneca Waterways Council (SWC) serves youth in the Counties of Ontario, Wayne, Seneca, Yates, and Monroe and the city of Rochester, New York.

Suffolk County Council

Suffolk County Council serves scouts in Suffolk County, on Long Island, New York. Baiting Hollow Scout Camp is the council camp.

Theodore Roosevelt Council 

Theodore Roosevelt Council supports Scouting in Nassau County, New York.

Twin Rivers Council

Twin Rivers Council is based in Albany, New York. It serves a large geographic area that encompasses 13 counties of Northeastern New York. 
The original portion of Twin Rivers was formed in 1991 by a merger of the former Governor Clinton Council (Columbia, Rensselaer and Albany Counties), the Sir William Johnson Council (Hamilton, Fulton & Montgomery counties) and the Saratoga Council (Saratoga County).  A year or so later the Schenectady County Council (Schenectady County) was added after working out issues between the entities.  Then in 1999, the Mohican (Warren and Washington counties) consolidated into the council. On February 14, 2006, the Adirondack Council (Franklin, Clinton and Essex Counties) and the Twin Rivers Council merged to form the current boundaries of the Twin Rivers Council #364.

Organization
The council has 5 Districts.

Fort Orange District (Albany County)
Adirondack District (Clinton, Franklin, and Northern Essex counties)
Mohawk District (Fulton, Hamilton, Montgomery, Schenectady Counties and the Town of Clifton Park)
Yankee Doodle District (Columbia and Rensselaer Counties as well as the communities of Mechanicville and Stillwater) (Home Page)
Turning Point District (Northern Saratoga, Washington, and Warren Counties)

Camps

Rotary Scout Reservation

RSR's totem is the Thunderbird.

Rotary Scout Reservation is a  camp of the Twin Rivers Council, located in Poestenkill, New York.  The original part of the camp was donated by the Troy Rotary Club in 1922. Summer camp program areas include the Trail to First Class Program, where young Scouts can work on requirements needed to earn Tenderfoot, Second Class and First Class ranks. Following the introduction of the Kayaking and Traffic Safety merit badges for the 2012 summer camp season. As of the 2019 season RSR offers 45 merit badges in 9 program areas. In addition to the merit badge options, RSR offers an open schedule which allows Scouts to plan their day with a variety of outdoor experiences. The camp also offers several additional program areas designed to appeal to older Scouts, which include COPE, Mountain Biking, and Chillicothe.

The Chillicothe program at RSR offers Scouts and Leaders a look at American pioneer life in the 19th century. Scouts are encouraged to try their hand at activities such as candle making, flint and steel fire starting, blacksmithing, woodsman tools, tin-smithing, blacksmithing and more. Chillicothe is a program unique to RSR, and it is an often underutilized program. It was designed to encourage the return of older Scouts who had earned most of the merit badges offered by the camp. Prior to the 2019 Camp season it was decided that the Chillicothe program area was in need of some repair, so the area itself is currently closed and the badges that were offered have been moved to other program areas. This temporary closure is expected to be only until the New Nature Science Center Pavilion is opened, at which point any new additional donations and funding will go into the rebuilding of the Chillicothe Program area.

In 2012, RSR introduced Venturing Week, a week of resident camp for youth in the Venturing Program. In addition to various open programming opportunities, offerings included a full-week half-day COPE course, American Red Cross Wilderness First Aid, the New York State Department of Environmental Conservation Hunter Education course, and more. Since the venture program started gaining popularity in Twin Rivers Council in 2015, the venture week itself has been canceled and venture crews have been welcomed into the normal week to week program.

During the 2014 Year the camp decided to experiment with a STEM program dedicated to the last week of the season. Keeping with the style of the camp to try and only offer badges that scouts can't typically earn in a normal troop setting, the same has gone for STEM week. Past offerings have been the Robotics, Space Exploration, and Nuclear Sciences meritbadges. Each year the camp might have a different selection of "Supernova" Badges depending on available Volunteers or available skill sets of current staff members. In addition to adding merit badges during the week the camp has also offered sessions to for scouts to try and earn select BSA NOVA Awards. The Camp has also offered a few session in the past for STEM themed hobbies as well, most notable the ability for scouts to earn their Technician Ham Radio License.

Camp Wakpominee

Camp Wakpominee is a 1,200-acre camp located in Fort Ann, NY.  It is completely within the boundaries of the Adirondack Park, providing a base for Council trekking programs. The camp contains Sly Pond, a 42-acre lake.

Woodworth Lake Scout Reservation
Woodworth Lake Scout Reservation, was located in Gloversville, New York. The 1500 acre camp began operation in 1949. As of 2013, the camp has been sold to a private investor.

Camp Boyhaven

Camp Boyhaven was a 300-acre camp located in Middle Grove, New York.  It was founded as a Boy Scout camp in 1924 with a purchase of approximately 20 acres from the Frink family for Schenectady Council.  Over the years, the camp grew to encompass most of the old Frink family farm.  With the merger of Schenectady Council with Twin Rivers Council in 1991, it was converted to a Cub Scout and Webelos long term camp.

The totem of the camp is the "Toonerville Trolley,"  based on the trolley line that ran across the creek from the camp.

Each summer, the camp ran Cub Scout and Webelos resident and day camps.  The camp program and facilities are specially designed for Cub Scouts, Webelos scouts, and their families. Lean-to cabins and indoor plumbing make the transition to overnight camping easier for Cub Scouts and Webelos Scouts. An archery range, BB gun range, vertical climbing wall, water slide, and movie night are all provided to appeal to younger Scouts who are spending their first nights away from home. As of 2017, summer camp programs are no longer being held and the camp is in the process of being sold.

The Camp was officially converted to Camp Stomping Ground (a Non-BSA Summer Camp) at the beginning of 2020.

Camp Bedford
Camp Bedford, is located at 10424 State Rt. 30, Malone, NY (near the Meacham Lake NYS DEC Campground, north of Paul Smiths, and south of Malone, NY). Charles E. Bedford donated  to the Adirondack Council in 1943 to establish the camp, making it at the time the largest donation of land to any council in the US.

Order of the Arrow
The Order of the Arrow Lodge for Twin Rivers Council is Kittan Lodge 364.

Westchester-Putnam Council

Westchester-Putnam Council serves Scouts in southeastern New York State. In 2021, it merged with the Hudson Valley Council to become the Greater Hudson Valley Council.

Girl Scouts

New York state is served by eight Girl Scouts councils. In addition, the Edith Macy Conference Center belonging to the national organization is in Briarcliff Manor, and the national headquarters is in New York City.

National headquarters
The national headquarters has been in various places in New York City since 1916 when it moved there from Washington, D.C.  It has been at 420 Fifth Avenue since 1992. Small groups can visit with prior reservations and visiting girls may be able to take part in a focus group meeting.

Edith Macy Conference Center

Edith Macy Conference Center is a national conference and training facility of the Girl Scouts of the USA (GSUSA) It is located in Briarcliff Manor. The site has had four names: Camp Edith Macy (C.E.M.) - University In The Woods, Edith Macy Training School, Edith Macy Girl Scout National Center and since 1982, Edith Macy Conference Center. However, it is often simply referred to as Macy. The John J. Creedon Education Center and Camp Andree Clark are part of the complex. Macy hosted the Girl Guides and Girl Scouts Fourth International Conference in 1926. Camp Andree Clark hosted the GSUSA's Silver Jubilee Camp in 1937.

Girl Scouts of Connecticut

Fishers Island in Suffolk County, New York is served by the Girl Scouts of Connecticut due to the close ties between the island and Connecticut.

Girl Scout Council of Greater New York

Girl Scouts of Greater New York serves some 25,000 girls and has over 8,700 volunteers in New York City.

The council camp is  Camp Henry Kaufmann in Holmes, NY.

Girl Scouts Heart of the Hudson

Girl Scouts Heart of the Hudson serves over 34,000 girls. The council was formed through the merger of five counties: Dutchess, Rockland, Orange, Putnam and Westchester.

Camps
It was founded in 1951 and named for Dr. Addisone Boyce who had been active in finding a suitable camp.
It was given to the Girl Scouts of Ulster County in 1926 by the Borden family.
It has been used by the Girl Scouts since 1922 (initially leased and then purchased in 1927).

Girl Scouts of Nassau County

Girl Scouting In Nassau County started in 1917.It is chartered by GSUSA to develop, maintain and administer Girl Scouting in Nassau County.

Camps
Camp Blue Bay in East Hampton, New York is the council camp.  Camp Tekakwitha was sold in June 2007 to Southampton, NY which will retain it as open space.

Girl Scouts of Northeastern New York

Girl Scouts of Northeastern New York (GSNENY) was created in June 2007 from the union of four Girl Scout Councils: Hudson Valley, Mohawk Pathways, Adirondack and North Country. 
GSNENY serves the following counties: Albany, Clinton, Columbia, Greene, Essex, Franklin, Fulton, Montgomery, Hamilton, Rensselaer, Saratoga, Schenectady, Schoharie, Warren, and Washington Counties; along with, a portion of St. Lawrence County.
With Service Centers in Albany, Queensbury, and Plattsburgh; GSNENY serves over 10,000 girls and has more than 4,500 adults and volunteers.

Camps
Girl Scouts of Northeastern New York  owns five camp properties in the Adirondack region, to include two overnight camps:
 Camp Meadowbrook is located in Queensbury, New York. 
 Camp Wood Haven is near Galway, New York.  
It features a large playing field, pond, beach, creek, hiking trails, cabins, platform tents, a nature center, and Troop House.

Girl Scouts of NYPENN Pathways

NYPenn Pathways was formed in June 2009, from five legacy councils - Seven Lakes Council, Central New York Council, Foothills Council, Indian Hills Council and Thousand Islands Council.  NYPenn Pathways serves girls in 24 New York State counties and 2 Pennsylvania counties with a total girl registration totaling about 27,000.

Organization
 Binghamton, New York
 Horseheads, New York
 New Hartford, New York
 Norwich, New York
 Oneonta, New York
 Phelps, New York
 Syracuse, New York
 Watertown, New York

Camps
 Camp Agaliha (Cherokee for 'sunshine') is a summer camp located on Camp Kingsley near Rome, New York
 Camp Amadaha (Located at Gulf Summit, N.Y. 1920–1925, relocated to Camp Arrowhead)
 Amahami Outdoor Center is  including a  lake near Deposit, New York
 Bayberry Program Center, near Geneva, New York
 Camp Near Wilderness near West Monroe, New York is currently closed.
 Camp Trefoil is  near Harrisville, New York.  It was acquired in 1949
 Comstock Program Center, on Cayuga Lake, New York
 Misty Hollow Program Center, near Corning, New York
 Sugar Creek Program Center, near Troy, Pennsylvania
 Yaiewano Program Center, on Owasco Lake, New York

NYPenn Pathway's Original Five Councils
 Central New York Council served Cortland, Onondaga, Oswego and portions of Madison County
 Foothills Council served Herkimer and Oneida Counties, most of Madison County and parts of Otsego, Lewis, and Hamilton counties
 Indian Hills Council served Broome, Chenango, Delaware, parts of Otsego County
 Seven Lakes Council, the largest of the original five, served Allegany, Cayuga, Chemung, Ontario, Schuyler, Seneca, Steuben, Tioga, Tompkins, Yates and Wayne Counties; and in Pennsylvania: Bradford and Tioga Counties
 Thousand Islands Council served Lewis, Jefferson, and St. Lawrence Counties

Girl Scouts of Suffolk County

Girl Scouts of Suffolk County serves more than 43,000 girls and has more than 9,000 adult volunteers.  The first troop in the county was started in 1915.

Camps

Girl Scouts of Western New York

Girl Scouts of Western New York was created on July 1, 2008, from legacy councils: Girl Scout Council of Buffalo & Erie County, Inc., Girl Scouts of Genesee Valley, Inc., Girl Scouts of Niagara County, Inc., Chautauqua Area Girl 
Scout Council, Inc., and Girl Scouts of Southwestern New York, Inc. The council serves some 15,000 girls within Erie, Chautauqua, Cattaraugus, Genesee, Livingston, Niagara, Orleans, Monroe, and Wyoming counties.

Camps
 Camp Piperwood in Perinton, New York
 Camp Seven Hills in Holland, New York is  including two lakes.
 Camp Timbercrest in Randolph, New York is  including a  lake.

Baden-Powell Service Association

New York is home to six chartered groups of the Baden-Powell Service Association.  The BPSA is an all-inclusive, "back to basics" organization that welcomes boys and girls, men and women from 5 years of age through adulthood, "regardless of race, gender identity, sexual orientation, class, ability, religion (or no religion), or other differentiating factors".

91st Sojourners

The 91st Sojourners group is based in greater Kingston, NY.  The group was named after 19th-century abolitionist (and Ulster County native) Sojourner Truth.

5th Prospect Park

5th Prospect Park was the first BPSA group in New York City.  It was founded in 2013 as the "5th Brooklyn Scouts" by Todd Schweikert, a former Eagle Scout who was looking for a more inclusive experience for his son.  When new BPSA groups were spun off in 2016, the name was changed to "Prospect Park".

67th Wallabout Bay

67th Wallabout Bay is one of two groups that spun off from 5th Prospect Park in 2016.  It is based in Fort Greene, Brooklyn, and takes its name from the curved bay between the Williamsburg and Manhattan Bridges, where the Brooklyn Navy Yard sits.

234th Stuy Rangers

234th Stuy Rangers is one of two groups that spun off from 5th Prospect Park in 2016.  It serves the Bedford–Stuyvesant neighborhood.

89th Flatbush

90th Flatbush was formed in 2017, representing the Flatbush neighborhood.

1213th Lookout Hill

1213th Lookout Hill was formed in 2017.  Based in the neighborhood of Windsor Terrace, on the south edge of Prospect Park, it was named after one of the highest points in the park.

International Scouting units
In addition, there are Armenian Scouts and Estonian Scouts in Exile in New York City, and Külföldi Magyar Cserkészszövetség Hungarian Scouting maintains two troops in New York City and one in Buffalo. Also, there are large contingents of active Plast Ukrainian Scouts in New York City.

West Point Camporee

The West Point Camporee annual Invitational event, started in 1963, run by a Cadet Officer, held around the first week of May since 2001 on the grounds of Lake Frederick.  Cadets are allowed to invite their home Scouting Units.  Managed by the Scoutmasters' Council.

Scouting museums
 Camp Boyhaven Scouting Museum, Middle Grove, New York
 Ten Mile River Scout Museum, Narrowsburg, New York
 William Hillcourt Scout Museum and Carson Buck Memorial Library named for William Hillcourt, and Carson Buck, Constantia, New York

See also

 Scouting in Ontario
 Scouting in Québec
 Knickerbocker Greys

References

External links

 William Hillcourt Scout Museum and Carson Buck Memorial Library

New York